"Tu Kuja Man Kuja" is a qawwali performed by Nusrat Fateh Ali Khan. It was composed by Nusrat Fateh Ali Khan himself and written by Muzaffar Warsi.

2016 version 

In 2016, the song was covered by Rafaqat Ali Khan and Shiraz Uppal, with the music video directed by Uppal. It was produced by Strings during Coke Studio season 9 episode 7 finale of Pakistani musical TV show of Coke Studio.

Song credits 

 Artists: Shiraz Uppal & Rafaqat Ali Khan
 Music Director: Shiraz Uppal
 Produced & Directed By: Strings
 Houseband: Imran Akhoond (Guitars), Babar Khanna (Dholak/Tabla), Haider Ali (Keyboards/Piano), Abdul Aziz Kazi (Percussions)
 Guest Musician: Amir Azhar (Banjo), Rahil Mirza (Guitars), Umair Hassan (Keyboards), Fazal Abbas (Tabla), Bradley Dsouza (Bass), Nadeem Iqbal (Harmonium)
 Humnawa: Zahid Sabri, Danish Sabrim, Mohammad Shah, Junaid Warsi

Popularity 
The music video of the song featured Rafaqat Ali Khan and Shiraz Uppal. It was released on 23 September 2016. It was the 3rd Pakistani origin Coke Studio video to reach 100 million views after Tajdar-e-Haram(1st video), Afreen Afreen(2nd video) and Tera Woh Pyar(4th video). As of 4 May 2021, the music video has received 148 million views on YouTube.

References 

Coke Studio (Pakistani TV program)
1982 songs
Nusrat Fateh Ali Khan songs
2016 singles
Pakistani songs
Urdu-language songs